E59 may refer to:
 European route E59
 Nimzo-Indian Defence, Encyclopaedia of Chess Openings code
 Hakodate-Esashi Expressway, route E59 in Japan